Urodacus excellens is a species of scorpion in the Urodacidae family. It is endemic to Australia, and was first described in 1888 by British zoologist Reginald Innes Pocock.

Distribution and habitat
The species occurs in the tropical Top End of the Northern Territory.

References

 

 
excellens
Scorpions of Australia
Endemic fauna of Australia
Fauna of the Northern Territory
Animals described in 1888
Taxa named by R. I. Pocock